The 21st European Women's Artistic Gymnastics Championships were held from 16-19 May 1996 in Birmingham, England.

Medalists

Medal table

Combined

Seniors

Juniors

Senior results

All-around

Vault

Uneven bars

Balance beam

Floor exercise

Junior Results

Vault

Uneven bars

Balance beam

Floor exercise

References 

1996
European Artistic Gymnastics Championships
1996 in European sport
International sports competitions in Birmingham, West Midlands
International gymnastics competitions hosted by the United Kingdom
1996 in English sport